The Gryllomorphinae are a subfamily of crickets (Orthoptera: Ensifera) based on the type genus Gryllomorpha.  Species have been recorded from: North Africa and the western Palaearctic (mainland).

Tribes and Genera
The Orthoptera Species File includes two tribes:

Gryllomorphini

Auth. Saussure, 1877
 Eugryllodes Chopard, 1927
 Gryllomorpha Fieber, 1853

Petaloptilini
Auth. Baccetti, 1960
 Acroneuroptila Baccetti, 1960
 Glandulosa Harz, 1979
 Ovaliptila Gorochov, 2006
 Petaloptila Pantel, 1890

References

External links
 
 

Orthoptera subfamilies
Ensifera
crickets